Begum Mushtari Shafi (15 January 1938 – 20 December 2021) was a Bangladeshi writer, entrepreneur, women's leader and social organiser.

Life and career
Shafi was born on 15 January 1938 in West Bengal of the then British India. Her ancestral home is in Faridpur District. Her father's workplace was in Kolkata during the time of her birth. She worked as a Shobdo Sainik at the Swadhin Bangla Betar Kendra during the Bangladesh Liberation War.

Shafi was selected an honorary fellow of Bangla Academy in 2016 for her contribution to the Bangladesh Liberation War.

Shafi died on 20 December 2021, at the age of 83 in Dhaka.

Awards
 Anannya Literature Award (2017)
 Begum Rokeya Padak (2020)

References

1938 births
2021 deaths
People from Faridpur District
Bangladeshi women writers
Honorary Fellows of Bangla Academy
Recipients of Begum Rokeya Padak